Balaclava or Balaklava most often refers to:

 Balaklava, a town in Crimea
 Battle of Balaclava, a battle during the Crimean War
 Balaklava District, an administrative raion (district) of the city of Sevastopol
 Balaclava (clothing), a form of headgear also known as a "balaclava helmet" or "ski mask"

Balaclava or Balaklava may also refer to:

Other places 
 Balaclava, New South Wales, Australia
 Balaklava, South Australia, Australia
 Balaclava, Victoria, Australia
 Division of Balaclava, a former electoral division
 Balaclava, Grey County, Ontario, Canada
 Balaclava, Renfrew County, Ontario, Canada
 Balaclava, Jamaica
 Balaclava railway station, Jamaica
 Balaclava, New Zealand, a suburb of Dunedin
 Balaclava Junction, a tram junction in Caulfield North, Victoria, Australia
 Balaclava Bay, Portland Harbour, England
 Balaclava Mine, in the Australian ghost town of Whroo, Victoria

Other uses 
 Balaklava, a GWR Iron Duke Class steam locomotive
 Balaklava (album), by Pearls Before Swine, 1968
 "Balaclava" (song), a song by the Arctic Monkeys from the 2007 album Favourite Worst Nightmare
 Balaclava (film), a 1928 British silent war film

See also

 Baklava, a layered pastry dessert